Emerson José da Conceição (born August 3, 1982 in Rancharia), known as Emerson or Emerson Conceição, is a Brazilian footballer who plays as a goalkeeper.

Career statistics

Honours 
Paysandu 
 Campeonato Paraense: 2016, 2017
 Copa Verde: 2016

References

External links

1982 births
Living people
Brazilian footballers
Brazilian expatriate footballers
Association football goalkeepers
Campeonato Brasileiro Série A players
Campeonato Brasileiro Série B players
Campeonato Brasileiro Série C players
Paulista Futebol Clube players
Guarani FC players
Boa Esporte Clube players
Paysandu Sport Club players
Londrina Esporte Clube players
DPMM FC players
Brazilian expatriate sportspeople in Brunei
Expatriate footballers in Brunei